SWFTools is an open source software tool suite for creating and manipulating SWF files. Distributed under the terms of the GPL-2.0-or-later, it may be compiled from C source, to run under Linux, Microsoft Windows, and Apple OS X. On Microsoft Windows systems, the pre-compiled installer also installs a GUI wrapper for the suite's PDF to SWF conversion tool, pdf2swf.

SWFTools relies upon, and links against, additional third-party libraries for some of its functionality, e.g. Xpdf, PDFlib, freetype, and libjpeg.

Tools
The current stable SWFTools suite, version 0.9.2, consists of the following components:

Extra and/or adapted commands are available in the development versions and the Git repository.

The SWFTools suite also includes a Python gFX API library, consisting of a PDF parser (based on xpdf) and a number of rendering back-ends. Using the API, one can extract text from PDF pages, create bitmaps from PDF, and convert PDF files to SWF. The latter functionality is similar to that offered by the standalone pdf2swf utility detailed above, but more powerful: the API can create individual SWF files from single PDF pages, or composite pages from different PDF files.

References

External links
 

Adobe Flash
Free 2D animation software
Free multimedia software
Motion graphics software for Linux